The Continental Medical College (CMC) is a private medical school located in Lahore, Punjab, Pakistan. It is registered with Pakistan Medical and Dental Council, affiliated with University of Health Sciences, Lahore and approved by the Ministry of National Health Services Regulation and Coordination, Government of Pakistan. It is also accredited by [Educational Commission for Foreign Medical Graduates]

External links
 CMC official website

Medical colleges in Punjab, Pakistan
2006 establishments in Pakistan
Educational institutions established in 2006